Joseph Boyden  (born October 31, 1966) is a Canadian novelist and short story writer of Irish and Scottish descent. He also claims Indigenous descent, but this is widely disputed. Joseph Boyden is best known for writing about First Nations culture. Three Day Road, a novel about two Cree soldiers serving in the Canadian military during World War I, was inspired by Ojibwa Francis Pegahmagabow, the legendary First World War sniper.  Joseph Boyden's second novel, Through Black Spruce, follows the story of Will, son of one of the characters in Three Day Road. The third novel in the Bird family trilogy was published in 2013 as The Orenda.

Life and career
Joseph Boyden grew up in Willowdale, North York, Ontario, and attended the Jesuit-run Brebeuf College School. The ninth of eleven children, he is the son of Blanche (Gosling) and Raymond Wilfrid Boyden, a medical officer renowned for his bravery, who was awarded the Distinguished Service Order and was the most highly decorated medical officer of World War II.

Joseph Boyden studied humanities at York University and received an MFA in Fiction from the University of New Orleans in 1995. He was a professor in the Aboriginal Student Program at Northern College during 1995–1997. He taught at the University of New Orleans during 1998–2010, where he served as writer-in-residence. He was also a lecturer with the University of British Columbia's Creative Writing Program during 2013–2015.

To date, Joseph Boyden has received five honorary doctorates and degrees. His first honorary doctorate in 2009 (Doctor of Letters, honoris causa) was awarded from Nipissing University.  In 2013, Joseph Boyden was awarded a second honorary doctorate from Algoma University. He was awarded a third honorary doctorate from Sir Wilfrid Laurier University in 2014, a fourth from Trent University in 2015, as well as an honorary degree from Humber College in 2015. Joseph was awarded the Queen Elizabeth II Diamond Jubilee Medal in 2013. He sits on the board of the Canadian Civil Liberties Association.

In 2014 Joseph accepted a commission from the Royal Winnipeg Ballet to write a ballet about residential schools in Canada. Joseph Boyden's ballet Going Home Star – Truth and Reconciliation premiered in 2014 and travelled across the country.

As a public speaker, Joseph regularly addresses Indigenous Canadian, environmental, and mental health issues.

On December 30, 2015, Joseph Boyden was appointed as a Member of the Order of Canada "for his contributions as an author, who tells stories of our common heritage, and for his social engagement, notably in support of First Nations".

Joseph Boyden was married to author Amanda Boyden from 1995 to 2018. In 2020, Amanda Boyden published a memoir, I Got the Dog, in which she wrote about the circumstances that brought on the end of their marriage.

Joseph Boyden lives in Georgian Bay, Ontario with his wife Laura and their two sons. In 2019, Boyden wrote about coming home and finding new life in Georgian Bay Today magazine. Joseph Boyden is the co-creator of Sweetwater Writers Workshop in Parry Sound, Ontario, Canada. Sweetwater Writers Workshop offers one-on-one mentorships, creative writing workshops and hosts retreats.

Controversies surrounding genealogy and tribal affiliation
Joseph Boyden is primarily of Irish and Scottish ancestry. A number of Indigenous writers and researchers came forward to publicly state Joseph did not have the right to speak on behalf of any Indigenous community because he was not a First Nations citizen and ultimately not Indigenous.

Joseph's claims to Indigenous heritage subsequently became the subject of public dispute when an APTN National News article, "Author Joseph Boyden's shape-shifting Indigenous identity" by Jorge Barrera, was published December 23, 2016. Barrera's article investigates Joseph's past claims of Mi'kmaq, and Métis ancestry as well as his current claims of being Nipmuc and Ojibway. Barrera brought to light facts surrounding Joseph's uncle Earl Boyden, who went by the name "Injun Joe". Earl Boyden was an artist in Algonquin Park and was the subject of a 1956 Maclean's article titled, "The Double Life of Injun Joe", in which the author reports that he has no "Indian blood." Barrera's search of Joseph's family tree could not locate any Indigenous ancestry. Joseph's mother, who was briefly interviewed via telephone by Barrera, said that her son was researching her family's history.

Joseph, who had refused an interview with APTN for the article, responded by Twitter on December 24. Joseph stated he admitted he'd called himself Métis, but only meant the term to mean mixed blood. He continued to assert his maternal Ojibway and paternal Nipmuc roots.

Subsequently, Rebeka Tabobondung, editor of Muskrat Magazine, revealed Boyden had told her he was from the Wasauksing First Nation. Tabobondung, who is from Wasauksing, followed up to find his family connection and could not. However, Boyden's family did own a private island near the community.

Over the next weeks a series of Indigenous writers, activists and politicians including Wab Kinew, Drew Hayden Taylor Hayden King, Ryan McMahon, and others wrote about the controversy in national media. They asked on what basis Joseph felt he had expertise to represent issues if he was not Indigenous, and asked to whom he was accountable, as some of the positions he was presenting seemed out of line with ongoing work in Indigenous communities.

On January 12, 2017, Joseph gave his first public interviews since the appearance of the APTN article. He personally selected the interviewers who were both friends of his, Mark Medley of The Globe and Mail, and Candy Palmater, a comedian who occasionally worked at CBC. Joseph now admitted he had erroneously identified himself as Mi'kmaq in the past. He continued to identify as a "white kid with native roots", Ojibway on his mother's side and Nipmuc on his father's side. He denied that he had relied on his identity as an Indigenous person to popularize his books, and he stated he had only won one literary prize based on heritage and little money. He did, however, apologize for taking up too much of the "air space" and stated he would do less public speaking, thus allowing for Indigenous voices to be heard in the media.

Reaction to the interviews was mixed. Subsequent reports by Canadaland and other researchers turned up inconsistencies in Joseph's claims and failed to find any native ancestry in Joseph's background.

In an August 2, 2017 essay in Maclean's magazine, Joseph Boyden stated that he had taken a DNA test which listed "Native American DNA". For Joseph's critics, the results mean little, as broad DNA categories do not constitute membership to a nation. According to First Nations genetics expert Kim Tallbear, DNA testing for Native ancestry as a racial category is not scientifically possible, and is often confused with DNA testing that confirms specific familial lineage. Joseph's ex-wife Amanda Boyden was asked about the DNA testing in a 2020 interview, and described the results as showing "a few drops of indigenous blood from... Greenland", and stated that Joseph "has no DNA that can be traced to the First Nations people in Canada or the Americas at large".

The public revelations about Joseph's roots threatened to impact the release of his new fiction novel. Ojibway filmmaker Lisa Meeches stepped forward to adopt Joseph as a spiritual sibling, saying she was motivated both by her brother's recent death and a desire to protect Joseph's work.

During the defence of a lawsuit, Boyden had provided a photocopy of his "status card", a document appearing to be an ID card for the Ontario Métis Aboriginal Association (also known as the Woodland Métis Tribe). Research by journalist Eric Andrew Gee led to the following comment in the 7 August 2017 issue of the Globe and Mail: "the OMAA ... is a complicated and in many ways troubled organization held in low esteem by some prominent Métis Canadians for its legal and financial misadventures over the years, and its lax membership policy that does not require any proof of Indigenous ancestry. Nor does the group provide "status cards" – Indian status can only be conferred by the federal government. The ID Joseph Boyden flourishes like a trump in his affidavit is little more than a piece of paper."

Politics
In 2015 Boyden condemned Stephen Harper during the 2015 Canadian federal election, calling his politics "race-baiting" and "fear-mongering".

Bibliography

Novels
 Three Day Road. Toronto: Penguin Canada, 2005. (winner, the inaugural McNally Robinson Aboriginal Book of the Year Award; winner, the Amazon/Books in Canada First Novel Award; winner, the Rogers Writers' Trust Fiction Prize, 2006; included in Canada Reads 2006; longlisted for the 2007 International Dublin Literary Award; nominated for the 2005 Governor General's Awards)
 Through Black Spruce. Toronto: Penguin Canada, 2008. (winner of the Scotiabank Giller Prize, November 2008)
The Orenda. Toronto: Hamish Hamilton, 2013. (longlisted for the 2013 Scotiabank Giller Prize, shortlisted nominee for the 2013 Governor General's Award for English fiction, winner of the 2014 Canada Reads competition)
 Wenjack. Toronto: Penguin Canada, 2016.

Short stories
 Born With a Tooth Toronto: Cormorant Books, 2001.

Non-fiction
 From Mushkegowuk to New Orleans: A Mixed Blood Highway. Edmonton: NeWest, 2008
 Extraordinary Canadians: Louis Riel And Gabriel Dumont. Toronto: Penguin Canada, 2010
 Kwe: Standing With Our Sisters. (editor) Toronto: Penguin Canada, 2014. (An anthology with more than fifty contributors to raise awareness of the crisis facing Indigenous women in Canada, with all proceeds going to Amnesty International's No More Stolen Sisters campaign)

References

Further reading
 Boyden, item at English-Canadian writers, Athabasca University, by J. McKay; with links added

1966 births
Living people
Canadian male novelists
Canadian male short story writers
Canadian people of Irish descent
Canadian people of Scottish descent
University of New Orleans faculty
People from Willowdale, Toronto
Writers from Toronto
21st-century Canadian novelists
21st-century Canadian short story writers
Members of the Order of Canada
Indspire Awards
21st-century Canadian male writers
University of New Orleans alumni
Amazon.ca First Novel Award winners
Race-related controversies in literature